The 2002 European Canoe Slalom Championships took place in Bratislava, Slovakia between 12 and 14 July 2002 under the auspices of the European Canoe Association (ECA). It was the 4th edition of the senior championships. It was also the 1st edition of the Under 23 European Championships, which in the following years were held together with the Junior European Championships. The team events were held as an open event for both senior and U23 athletes. Countries were allowed to enter two teams in each team event. The races took place at the Čunovo Water Sports Centre on an offshoot of the Danube river.

Medal summary

Men's results

Canoe

Senior

U23

Kayak

Senior

U23

Women's results

Kayak

Senior

U23

Medal tables

Senior

Under 23

Total

References
 Official results
 European Canoe Association

European Canoe Slalom Championships
European Junior and U23 Canoe Slalom Championships
European Canoe Slalom Championships
European Canoe Slalom Championships
Sports competitions in Bratislava
Canoeing and kayaking competitions in Slovakia
2000s in Bratislava
July 2002 sports events in Europe